Neargyractis caesoalis is a moth in the family Crambidae. It was described by Francis Walker in 1859. It is found in Rio de Janeiro, Brazil.

References

Acentropinae
Moths described in 1859